The Hakka, sometimes also referred to as Hakka Han, or Hakka Chinese, or Hakkas are a Han Chinese subgroup whose ancestral homes are chiefly in the Hakka-speaking provincial areas of Guangdong, Fujian, Jiangxi, Guangxi, Sichuan, Hunan, Zhejiang, Hainan, Guizhou in China, as well as in Taoyuan City, Hsinchu County, Miaoli County, Pingtung County, and Kaohsiung City in Taiwan. The Chinese characters for Hakka literally mean "guest families". Unlike other Han Chinese subgroups, the Hakkas are not named after a geographical region, e.g. a province, county or city, in China. The word Hakka or "guest families" is Cantonese in origin and originally refers to the Northern Chinese migrants fleeing social unrest, upheaval and invasions in northern parts of China (such as Gansu and Henan) during the Qing dynasty who then sought sanctuary in the Cantonese provinces such as Guangdong and Guangxi, thus the original meaning of the word implies that they are guests living in the Cantonese provinces. Of course, over the centuries, they have since more or less assimilated with the Cantonese people. Modern day Hakka are generally identified by both full Hakka and by different degrees of Hakka ancestry and usually speak Hakka Chinese.  

The Hakkas are thought to have originated from the central plains. Genetic studies have shown that the Hakka people are largely descended from North Han Chinese. In a series of migrations, the Hakkas moved and settled in their present areas in South China and from there, substantial numbers migrated overseas to various countries throughout the world. As the most diasporic among the Chinese community groups, the worldwide population of Hakkas (including in mainland China, Hong Kong, Macau, and Taiwan) is about 80 million to 120 million. The Hakkas moved from Central China into Southern China at a time when the earlier Han Chinese settlers who already lived there had developed distinctive cultural identities and languages from Hakkas. The Tunbao and Chuanqing people are other Han Chinese subgroups that migrated from possibly somewhere in Central or Eastern China to Southwestern China while maintaining their ancestral traditions which differentiated them from the native Chinese people.

The Hakka people have had significant influence on the course of modern Chinese and overseas Chinese history; in particular, they have been a source of many government and military leaders—in 1984, over half of the Standing Committee of the Chinese Communist Party Politburo were Hakka.

The Hakka language is the most closely related to Gan and is sometimes classified as a variety of Gan, with a few northern Hakka varieties even being partially mutually intelligible with southern Gan. There are also some studies that consider Hakka people and Gan people have related genetics and shared areal features. Today, Hakka is one of the official languages of Taiwan. But like other official languages such as Hokkien and Formosan languages, they do not have the de facto special status of Taiwanese Mandarin (Guoyu).

Origins, migrations and group identification

Migrations
Migrants were referred to as Hakka and no specific people were referred to as Hakka at first. Northern China's Yellow River area was the homeland of the Hakka.

Since the Qin dynasty (221–206 BC), the ancestors of the Hakka people have migrated southwards several times because of social unrest, upheaval and invasions from the northern provinces (e.g. Gansu, Henan). Subsequent migrations also occurred at the end of the Tang dynasty in the 10th century to 12th century, the last of which saw a massive flood of refugees escaping southward when the nomadic barbarians invaded as well as from starvation and poor weather.

During the 16th century, in response to an economic boom, the Hakkas moved into hilly areas to mine for zinc and lead and also moved into the coastal plains to cultivate cash crops. After an economic downturn, many of these ventures failed and many people had to turn to pillaging to make ends meet.

Identity

Although different in some social customs and culture (e.g. linguistic differences) from the surrounding population, they belong to the Han Chinese majority. Historical sources shown in census statistics relate only to the general population, irrespective of particular districts, provinces or regions. These census counts were made during imperial times. They did not distinguish what Varieties of Chinese the population spoke. Therefore, they do not directly document Hakka migrations. The study by Lo Hsiang-lin, K'o-chia Yen-chiu Tao-Liu / An Introduction to the Study of the Hakkas (Hsin-Ning & Singapore, 1933) used genealogical sources of family clans from various southern counties.

According to the 2009 studies published in the American Journal of Human Genetics, Hakka genes are slightly  towards northern Han people compared with other southern Han people. Nevertheless, the study has also shown a common genetic relationship between tested Han Chinese testers with an average difference of 0.32%. 
Lingnan Hakka place names indicate a long history of the Hakka being culturally Han Chinese.

Unlike other Han Chinese groups, the Hakkas are not named after a geographical region, e.g. a province, county or city. The Hakka people have a distinct identity from the Cantonese people. As 60% of the Hakkas in China reside in Guangdong province and 95% of overseas Hakkas ancestral homes are in Guangdong. Hakkas from Chaoshan, Canton and Fujian may self-identify as only Chaoshanese, Cantonese and Hokkiens.

Strangers who find out that the other party is a Hakka will affectionately acknowledge each other as "chhit-kâ-ngìn" meaning "(one)self’s family".

Origins

It is commonly held that the Hakkas are a subgroup of the Han Chinese that originated in the central plains. To trace their origins, a number of theories so far have been brought forth among anthropologists, linguists and historians:

 The Hakkas are Han Chinese originating solely from the Central Plain; 
 The Hakkas are Han Chinese from the Central Plain, with some inflow of those already in the south; 
 The majority of the Hakkas are natives from the south, with portions coming from those in the north.
 The Hakkas are, genetically, the hybrid descendants of Ancient Han Chinese and local non-Han Hmong–Mien speaking ethnic groups such as the She people.
 The modern Hakka language shows traits of both the Old Chinese and proto-Hmong–Mien

The latter two theories are the most likely and are together supported by multiple scientific studies. Clyde Kiang stated that the Hakkas' origins may also be linked with the Han's ancient neighbors, the Dongyi and Xiongnu people. However, this is disputed by many scholars and Kiang's theories are considered to be controversial.

Hakka Chinese scientist and researcher Dr. Siu-Leung Lee stated in the book by Chung Yoon-Ngan, The Hakka Chinese: Their Origin, Folk Songs And Nursery Rhymes, that the potential Hakka origins from the Northern Han and Xiongnu and that of the indigenous Southern She and Yue tribes, "are all correct, yet none alone explain the origin of the Hakka", pointing out that the problem with "DNA typing" on limited numbers of people within population pools cannot correctly ascertain who are really the Southern Chinese, because many Southern Chinese are also from Northern Asia; Hakka or non-Hakka. It is known that the earliest major waves of Hakka migration began due to the attacks of the two aforementioned tribes during the Jin dynasty (266–420).

Discrimination and hatred of Hakkas

The Hakkas have been frequently subjected to hatred and discrimination by other Chinese ethnic groups which they have interacted with throughout history. The expressions of such prejudices by other ethnic groups have ranged from hurling minor verbal insults to committing genocides against the Hakkas.

Imperial era
In retaliation for capturing the Taiping Heavenly Kingdom, the Huxiang military killed 30,000 Hakkas every day during the height of the anti-Hakka mass-killing operation.

Government officials mobilized officers and men to kill the Hakkas, regained the Guanghai villages (region of Taishan city (臺山市) of Guangdong province) which was occupied by the Hakkas and massacred Hakkas indiscriminently. The number of Hakkas killed was tens of thousands in the Dalongdong area of Guanghai alone.

In retaliation for killing three Hunanese officers, the Hunanese forces exterminated the entire Hakka population of Wukeng and Chixi during military counter-attacks on the Hakkas in the year 1888. The Xiang army also massacred tens of thousands of other Hakkas in Guanghai.

By the Cantonese

Mass killings of Hakkas

The Cantonese Red Turban rebels carried out a genocidal campaign against the Hakkas during a revolt against the Qing Dynasty. The Cantonese Red Turbans killed 13 Hakka village chiefs and 7,630 other Hakkas while on their way to Heshan where they killed another 1,320 Hakkas after conquering it.

The bloody Punti-Hakka Clan Wars, which eventually killed some 500,000 Hakkas (or quite possibly even more), saw large-scale massacres against the Hakkas by Cantonese forces. After Hakka masacres against them, the Cantonese peasants butchered 500 Hakkas in a village located in the rural Enping county forcing the Hakkas to flee but they were later all murdered as well when they were caught and massacred by Cantonese peasants, who spared neither women and children Hakka, killing 4,000 of those Hakkas. 2,000 people which comprised half of the Hakka inhabitants of a village were exterminated in another Cantonese attack. Large numbers of Hakkas were killed in other places as well by the Cantonese, with the assistance of Xiang army.

Government officials mobilized officers and men from the local Cantonese peasants to kill the Hakkas, regained the Guanghai villages which was occupied by the Hakkas, and massacred the Hakkas. The number of Hakkas killed was tens of thousands in the Dalongdong area of Guanghai alone.

Cantonese overseas
The Cantonese murdered more than 70 Hakka fellow provincials in Shanghai under the justification of a Hakka conspiracy that the Jiaying group was surrendering the city to foreign control. In 27 August 1925, villages in a county belonged to the Hakka minority were attacked, Chiang's Punti (Cantonese) men and soldiers did not hesitate to rape their women and pillage their homes.

Resurfaced feelings of ethnic hatred and friction between the Hakkas and Cantonese in Perak, Malaya, led to the Larut Wars.

Upon arriving to Madagascar, the Cantonese colluded to prevent any Hakka migration to Madagascar.

By Guangxi people
More than 100,000 Hakkas were slaughtered by the Punti people again in Guangxi province during another clan war. In October 1850, the Cantonese and Hakkas were hacking and killing each other for over 40 days in Guigang.

By other Yue
Between 1925-1926, thousands were killed and wounded when the ethnic hatred of the Hakkas by the natives of Lingao turned violent in northwestern Hainan.

Culture

Hakka culture have been largely shaped by the new environment which they had to alter many aspects their culture to adapt, which helped influence their architecture and cuisine.  When the Hakka expanded into areas with pre-existing populations in the South, there was often little agricultural land left for them to farm. As a result, many Hakka men turned towards careers in the military or in public service. Consequently, the Hakka culturally emphasized education, however this is by no means unique to the Hakkas as most of the other Han Chinese also culturally emphasized education.

Language 

Hakka Chinese is the native Chinese variety of the Hakka people. Hakka Chinese is the closest Chinese variety to Gan Chinese in terms of phonetics, with scholars studies consider the late Old Gan together with Hakka Chinese and the Tongtai dialect of Jianghuai Mandarin to have been the lingua franca of the Southern Dynasties.

In Taiwan, the Ministry of Education named "Taiwanese Hakka Chinese" as one of the languages of Taiwan.

Arts

Hakka hill song 

Hakka hill songs are traditionally used by hillside farmers in parts of Taiwan and China, mainly for entertainment in the farming fields and courting practices. They are characterized by the strong, resonating melody and voice, which would echo around hills and can be heard for up to a mile around the area. Hill songs can be considered a form of communication, as its participants often use it to communicate love songs or news.

Hakkapop 
Hakkapop is a genre of Hakka pop music made primarily in China, Taiwan, Malaysia and Indonesia.

Media 
In Taiwan, there are seven Hakka Chinese radio channels. The Chinese radio station China National Radio's Sound of the Divine Land has a Hakka Chinese radio break.

Taiwan's Hakka TV was the first Hakka Chinese TV channel in the world. Meizhou TV-2 was the first Hakka Chinese TV channel in China.

Food culture 

Hakka cuisine is known for the use of preserved meats and tofu as well as stewed and braised dishes. Some of the popular dishes are Yong Tau Foo and Lei Cha. Yong Tau Foo is a Hakka Chinese food consisting primarily of tofu that has been filled with either a ground meat mixture or fish paste (surimi). Lei cha (Chinese: 擂茶; pinyin: léi chá; lit. 'pounded tea'; pronounced [lěi ʈʂʰǎ]) or ground tea is a traditional Southern Chinese tea-based beverage or gruel that forms a part of Hakka cuisine.

Foot binding 
Historically, Hakka women did not bind their feet when the practice was commonplace in China.

Architecture 

Hakka people built several types of tulou and peasant fortified villages in the mountainous rural parts of far western Fujian and adjacent southern Jiangxi and northern Guangdong regions. A representative sample of Fujian Tulou (consisting of 10 buildings or building groups) in Fujian were inscribed in 2008 as a UNESCO World Heritage Site.

Another very popular architectural style in northern east Guangdong, such as Xingning and Meixian, is Wrapped Dragon Village.

Religion 

The religious practices of Hakka people are largely similar to those of other Han Chinese. Ancestor veneration is the primary form of religious expression. One distinctively Hakka religious practice involves the worship of dragon deities.

Mainland China

Hakka populations are found in 13 out of the 27 provinces and autonomous regions of mainland China.

Guangdong

Hakkas who live in Guangdong comprise about 60% of the total Hakka population. Worldwide, over 95% of the overseas-descended Hakkas came from this Guangdong region, usually from Meizhou and Heyuan as well as other towns such as Shenzhen, Jieyang, Dongguan and Huizhou. Hakkas live mostly in the northeast part of the province, particularly in the so-called Xing-Mei (Xingning–Meixian) area. Unlike their kin in Fujian, Hakka in the Xingning and Meixian area developed a non-fortress-like unique architectural style, most notably the weilongwu ( or Hakka: Wui Lung Wuk) and sijiaolou ( or Hakka: Si Kok Liu).

Fujian

Tradition states that the early Hakka ancestors traveling from north China entered Fujian first, then by way of the Ting River they traveled to Guangdong and other parts of China, as well as overseas. Thus, the Tingjiang River is also regarded as the Hakka Mother River.

The Hakkas who settled in the mountainous region of south-western Fujian province developed a unique form of architecture known as the tulou, literally meaning earthen structures. The tulou are round or square and were designed as a combined large fortress and multi-apartment building complex. The structures typically had only one entrance-way, with no windows at ground level. Each floor served a different function: the first floor contained a well and livestock, the second food storage and the third and higher floors living spaces. Tulou were built to withstand attack from bandits and marauders.

Today, Western Fujian is inhabited by 3 million Hakkas, scattered around villages in 10 counties (county-level 'cities' and districts) in Longyan and Sanming prefectures, 98% of whom are Hakkas living in Changting, Liancheng, Shanghang, Wuping, Yongding, Ninghua, Qingliu and Mingxi counties.

Jiangxi
Jiangxi contains the second largest Hakka community. Nearly all of southern Jiangxi province is Hakka, especially in Ganzhou. In the Song dynasty, a large number of Han Chinese migrated to the delta area as the Court moved southward because invasion of northern minority. They lived in Jiangxi and intermixed with the She and Yao minorities. Ganzhou was the place that the Hakka have settled before migrating to Western Fujian and Eastern Guangdong. During the early Qing dynasty, there was a massive depopulation in Gannan due to the ravage of pestilence and war. However, Western Fujian and Eastern Guangdong suffered population explosion at the same time. Some edicts were issued to block the coastal areas, ordering coastal residents to move to the inland. The population pressure and the sharp contradiction of the land redistribution drove some residents to leave. Some of them moved back to Gannan, integrating with other Hakka people who lived there already for generations. Thus, the modern Gannan Hakka community was finally formed.

Sichuan
The Kangxi Emperor (r. 1662–1722), after a tour of the land, decided the province of Sichuan had to be repopulated after the devastation caused by Zhang Xianzhong. Seeing the Hakka were living in poverty in the coastal regions in Guangdong province, the emperor encouraged the Hakkas in the south to migrate to Sichuan province. He offered financial assistance to those willing to resettle in Sichuan: eight ounces of silver per man and four ounces per woman or child.

Sichuan was originally the origin of the Deng lineage until one of them was hired as an official in Guangdong during the Ming dynasty but during the Qing plan to increase the population in 1671 they came to Sichuan again. Deng Xiaoping was born in Sichuan.

Hunan
Hakka people are mainly concentrated in Liuyang and Liling villages.

Henan
As with those in Sichuan, many Hakka emigrated to Xinyang Prefecture (in Southern Henan Province), where Li Zicheng carried out a massacre in Guangzhou (now in Huangchuan) on 17 Jan, 1636.

Hong Kong

During the 15th century to 19th century, Hong Kong was in the imperial district of Xin'an (now Shenzhen) County. The 1819 gazetteer lists 570 Punti and 270 Hakka contemporary settlements in the whole district. However, the area covered by Xin'an county is greater than what was to become the British imperial enclave of Hong Kong by 1898. Although there had been settlers originating from the mainland proper even before the Tang dynasty, historical records of those people are non-extant, only evidence of settlement from archaeological sources can be found. The New Territories lowland areas had been settled originally by several clan lineages in Kam Tin, Sheung Shui, Fanling, Yuen Long, Lin Ma Hang and Tai Po and hence termed the Punti before the arrival of the Hakka, and fishing families of the Tanka and Hoklo groups to the area. Since the prime farming land had already been farmed, the Hakka land dwellers settled in the less accessible and more hilly areas. Hakka settlements can be found widely distributed around the Punti areas, but in smaller communities. Many are found on coastal areas in inlets and bays surrounded by hills.

Hakka-speaking communities are thought to have arrived in the Hong Kong area after the rescinding of the coastal evacuation order in 1688, such as the Hakka speaking Lee clan lineage of Wo Hang, one of whose ancestors is recorded as arriving in the area in 1688.

As the strong Punti lineages dominated most of the north western New Territories, Hakka communities began to organise local alliances of lineage communities such as the Sha Tau Kok Alliance of Ten or Shap Yeuk as Patrick Hase writes. Hakka villages from Wo Hang to the west and Yantian to the east of Sha Tau Kok came to use it as a local market town and it became the center of Hakka dominance. Further, the Shap Yeuk's land reclamation project transforming marshland to arable farmland with the creation of dykes and levees to prevent storm flooding during the early 19th century shows an example of how local cooperation and the growing affluence of the landed lineages in the Alliance of Ten provided the strong cultural, socioeconomic Hakka influence on the area.

Farming and cultivation has been the traditional occupations of Hakka families from imperial times up until the 1970s. Farming was mostly done by Hakka women while their menfolk sought labouring jobs in the towns and cities. Many men entered indentured labour abroad as was common from the end of the 19th century to the Second World War. Post war, males took the opportunity to seek work in Britain and other countries later to send for their families to join them once they sent enough money back to cover travel costs.

As post war education became available to all children in Hong Kong, a new educated class of Hakka became more mobile in their careers. Many moved to the government planned new towns which sprung up from the 1960s. The rural Hakka population began to decline as people moved abroad, and away to work in the urban areas. By the end of the 1970s, agriculture was firmly in the decline in Hakka villages. Today, there are still Hakka villages around Hong Kong, but being remote, many of their inhabitants have moved to the post war new towns like Sheung Shui, Tai Po, Sha Tin and further afield.

Taiwan 

The Hakka population in Taiwan is around 4.6 million people today. Hakka people comprise about 15 to 20% of the population of Taiwan and form the second-largest ethnic group in the country. They are descended largely from Hakka who migrated from southern and northern Guangdong and western Fujian. The early Hakka immigrants were the island's first agriculturalists and formed the nucleus of the Chinese population, numbering tens of thousands at the time. They resided in "savage border districts, where land could be had for the taking, and where a certain freedom from official oppression was ensured." Back then the Hakka on Taiwan had gained a reputation with the authorities of being turbulent and lawless.

In the past the Hakka in Taiwan owned matchlock muskets. Han people traded and sold matchlock muskets to the Taiwanese aborigines. The Aboriginals used their matchlock muskets to defeat the Americans in the Formosa Expedition. During the Sino-French War the Hakka and Aboriginals used their matchlock muskets against the French in the Keelung Campaign and Battle of Tamsui.

Liu Mingchuan took measures to reinforce Tamsui, in the river nine torpedo mines were planted and the entrance was blocked with ballast boats filled with stone which were sunk on 3 September, matchlock armed "Hakka hill people" were used to reinforce the mainland Chinese battalion, and around the British Consulate and Customs House at the Red Fort hilltop, Shanghai Arsenal manufactured Krupp guns were used to form an additional battery.

Lin Ch'ao-tung was the leader of the Hakka militia recruited by Liu Ming-ch'uan.

The Hakka used their matchlock muskets to resist the Japanese invasion of Taiwan and Hakka Han people and Aboriginals conducted an insurgency against Japanese rule. The Hakka rose up against the Japanese in the Beipu uprising.

Taiwan's Hakka population concentrates in Hsinchu and Hsinchu County, Miaoli County and around Zhongli District in Taoyuan City and Meinong District in Kaohsiung and in Pingtung County, with smaller presences in Hualien County and Taitung County. In recent decades, many Hakka have moved to the largest metropolitan areas, including Taipei and Taichung.

On 28 December 1988, 14,000 Hakka protestors took to the streets in Taipei to demand the Nationalist government to "return our mother tongue", carrying portraits of Sun Yat-sen. The movement was later termed "1228 Return Our Mother Tongue Movement".

Hakka-related affairs in Taiwan are regulated by the Hakka Affairs Council. Hakka-related tourist attractions in Taiwan are Dongshih Hakka Cultural Park, Hakka Round House, Kaohsiung Hakka Cultural Museum, Meinong Hakka Culture Museum, New Taipei City Hakka Museum, Taipei Hakka Culture Hall and Taoyuan Hakka Culture Hall.

Hakkas elsewhere

There is a Hakka saying, "", which literally means "Wherever there is sunshine, there are Chinese; wherever there are Chinese, there are Hakka."

The Hakka have emigrated to many countries worldwide, notably Americas, Guyana, Suriname, Britain, India , Bangladesh, Vietnam (known as Ngái people), Thailand, Singapore, Brunei, Malaysia, Indonesia, Timor-Leste, Cambodia, Burma and French Polynesia.

Hakka people also emigrated to many countries in Europe, including Britain, Italy, France, Portugal, Spain, Germany, Austria, Belgium, Sweden and Netherlands. They also are found in South Africa and Mauritius, on the islands of the Caribbean (Jamaica and Trinidad and Tobago), in the Americas, particularly in the United States, Canada, Panama, Argentina and Brazil, as well as in Australia. Most expatriate Hakkas in Great Britain have ties to Hong Kong as many migrated there when Hong Kong still was a British colony during a period coinciding with the economic depression in Hong Kong.

Southeast Asia

Vietnam
There are two groups of Hakka in Vietnam. One is known as Ngái people and lives along the border with China in Northern Vietnam. Another group are Chinese immigrants to Southern Vietnam, known as Người Hẹ and is located around Saigon and Vũng Tàu.

Cambodia
About 65% of the Hakka trace their roots back to Meizhou and Heyuan prefectures in Guangdong Province. About 70% of the Hakkas are found in Phnom Penh where they dominate professions in the field of Traditional Chinese Medicine and shoemaking. Hakkas are also found in Takéo Province, Stung Treng and Rattanakiri who consist of vegetable growers and rubber plantation workers. Hakka communities in the provinces migrated to Cambodia through Tonkin and Cochinchina in the 18th and 19th centuries.

Thailand
There are no records as to when Hakka descendants arrived in Thailand. In 1901, Yu Cipeng, a Hakka member of The League Society of China came to visit Thailand and found that the establishment of many varied organizations among the Hakka was not good for unity. He tried to bring the two parties together and persuaded them to dissolve the associations in order to set up a new united one. In 1909 The Hakka Society of Siam was established and Chao Phraya Yommarat (Pan Sukhum), then Interior Minister, was invited to preside over the opening ceremony for the establishment of the society's nameplate, located in front of the Chinese shrine "Lee Tee Biao". Yang Liqing was its first President.

Singapore
In 2010, 232,914 people in Singapore reported Hakka ancestry.  Singapore's most prominent Hakka is its founding Prime Minister Lee Kuan Yew.

Malaysia

Hakka people form the second largest subgroup of the ethnic Chinese population of Malaysia, particularly in the peninsula, with several prominent Hakka figures emerging during colonial British rule.  There are 1,729,000 people of Hakka ancestry in Malaysia as of 2016. Chung Keng Quee, "Captain China" of Perak and Penang, was the founder of the mining town of Taiping, the leader of the Hai San, a millionaire philanthropist and an innovator in the mining of tin, having been respected by both Chinese and European communities in the early colonial settlement. Another notable Hakka was Yap Ah Loy, who founded Kuala Lumpur and was a Kapitan Cina of the settlement from 1868 to 1885, bringing significant economic contributions and was also an influential figure among the ethnic Chinese.

In the district of Jelebu, Negeri Sembilan, Hakka people make up more than 90% of the Chinese subgroup with dialect itself acting as a lingua franca there. This has contributed greatly to the fact that the place is commonly known among Hakka Chinese as "Hakka Village". The greatest concentration of Hakkas in northern peninsular Malaysia is in Ipoh, Perak and in Kuala Lumpur and its satellite cities in Selangor. Concentrations of Hakka people in Ipoh and surrounding areas are particularly high. The Hakkas in the Kinta Valley came mainly from the Jiaying Prefecture or Meixian, while those in Kuala Lumpur are mainly of Huizhou origin.

A large number of Hakka people are also found in Sarawak, particularly in the city of Kuching and Miri, where there is a notable population of Hakka people who speak the "Ho Poh" variant of Hakka.

In Sabah, most of the ethnic Chinese are of Hakka descent. In the 1990s, the Hakkas formed around 57% of the total ethnic Chinese population in Sabah.  Hakka is the lingua franca among the Chinese in Sabah to such an extent that Chinese of other subgroups who migrate to Sabah from other states in Malaysia and elsewhere usually learn the Hakka dialect, with varying degrees of fluency.

In 1882 the North Borneo Chartered Company opted to bring in Hakka labourers from Longchuan County, Guangdong. The first batch of 96 Hakkas brought to Sabah landed in Kudat on 4 April 1883 under the leadership of Luo Daifeng (Hakka: Lo Tai Fung). In the following decades Hakka immigrants settled throughout the state, with their main population centres in Kota Kinabalu (then known as Jesselton) and its surroundings (in the districts of Tuaran, Penampang, Ranau, Papar, Kota Belud as well as a lesser extent to Kota Marudu), with a significant minority residing in Sandakan (mainly ex-Taiping revolutionists) and other large populations in other towns and districts, most notably in Tawau, Tenom, Kuala Penyu, Tambunan, Lahad Datu, Semporna, Sipitang, Beaufort, Keningau and Kudat. The British felt the development of North Borneo was too slow and in 1920 they decided to encourage Hakka immigration into Sabah. In 1901, the total Chinese population in Sabah was 13897; by 1911, it had risen 100% to 27801. Hakka immigration began to taper off during World War 2 and declined to a negligible level in the late 1940s.

Indonesia

Migration of Hakka people to Indonesia happened in several waves. The first wave landed in Riau Islands such as in Bangka Island and Belitung as tin miners in the 18th century. The second group of colonies were established along the Kapuas River in Borneo in the 19th century, predecessor to early Singapore residents. In the early 20th century, new arrivals joined their compatriots as traders, merchants and labourers in major cities such as Jakarta, Surabaya, Bandung, Medan, etc.

In Indonesia, Malaysia and Singapore, Hakka people are sometimes known as Khek, from the Hokkien (Southern Min) pronunciation kheh of 客 (Hakka: hak). However, the use of the word 'Khek' is limited mainly to areas where the local Chinese population is mainly of Hokkien origin. In places where other Chinese subgroups predominate, the term 'Hakka' is still the more commonly used.

Bangka (in Indonesia)
Hakka also live in Indonesia's largest tin producer islands of Bangka Belitung Islands province. They are the second majority ethnic group after Malays. The Hakka population in the province is also the second largest in Indonesia after West Kalimantan's and one of the highest percentages of Chinese living in Indonesia.

The first group of Hakka in Bangka and Belitung reached the islands in the 18th century from Guangdong. Many of them worked as tin mining labourers. Since then, they have remained on the island along with the native Malay. Their situation was much different from those of Chinese and native populations of other regions, where legal cultural conflicts were prevalent since the 1960s until 1999, by which Indonesian Chinese had finally regained their cultural freedoms. Here they lived together peacefully and still practiced their customs and cultural festivals, while in other regions they were strictly banned by government legislation prior to 1999. Hakka on the island of Bangka spoke Hopo dialect mixed with Malay, especially in younger generations. Hakka spoken in Belinyu area in Bangka is considered to be standard.

West Kalimantan (in Indonesia)
Hakka people in Pontianak live alongside Teochew speaking Chinese. While the Teochews are dominant in the centre of Pontianak, the Hakka are more dominant in small towns along the Kapuas River in the regencies of Sanggau, Sekadau and Sintang. Their Hakka dialect is originally Hopo which influenced by Teochew dialect and also has vocabulary from the local Malay and Dayak tribes. The Hakka were instrumental in the Lanfang Republic.

The Hakka in this region are descendants of gold prospectors who migrated from China in the late 19th century.

The Hakka in Singkawang and the surrounding regencies of Sambas, Bengkayang, Ketapang and Landak speak a different standard of Hakka dialect to the Hakkas along the Kapuas River. Originally West Borneo has diverse Hakka origin but during the 19th century, a large people came from Jiexi so more Hakkas in the region speak Hopo mixed with Wuhua and Huilai accents that eventually formed the dialect of Singkawang Hakka.

Jakarta (in Indonesia)
Hakka people in Jakarta mainly have roots from Meizhou, who came in the 19th century. Secondary migration of the Hakkas from other provinces like Bangka Belitung Islands and West Borneo came later.

East Timor

There was already a relatively large and vibrant Hakka community in East Timor before the 1975 Indonesian invasion. According to an estimate by the local Chinese Timorese association, the Hakka population of Portuguese Timor in 1975 was estimated to be around 25,000 (including a small minority of other Chinese ethnicities from Macau, which like East Timor was a Portuguese colony). According to a book source, an estimated 700 Hakka were killed within the first week of invasion in Dili alone. No clear numbers had been recorded since many Hakka had already escaped to neighbouring Australia. The recent re-establishment of Hakka associations in the country registered approximately 2,400 Hakka remaining, organised into some 400 families, including part-Timorese ones.

The Timorese Hakka diaspora can currently be found in Darwin, Brisbane, Sydney and Melbourne in Australia; in Portugal; in Macau; and in other parts of the world in smaller numbers. They often are highly educated and many continue their education in either Taiwan or the People's Republic of China, while a majority of the younger generation prefer to study in Australia. The Australian government took some years to assess their claims to be genuine refugees and not illegal immigrants, as partially related to the political situation in East Timor at the time. As Asian countries were neither willing to accept them as residents nor grant them political asylum to the Timorese in general, they were forced to live as stateless persons for some time. Despite this condition, many Hakka had become successful, establishing restaurant chains, shops, supermarkets and import operations in Australia. Since the independence of East Timor in 2000, some Hakka families had returned and invested in businesses in the newborn nation.

South Asia

India
There used to be 1500 Hakkas largely at Tangra and Bombay, arriving after the great British Raj violence and chaos. 

However, from the 1960s, after armed fighting broke out, there has been a steady migration to other countries, which accelerated in the succeeding decades. The majority moved to Britain and Canada, while others went to the United States, Australia, Taiwan, Austria and Sweden. The predominant dialect of Hakka in these communities is Meixian.

Hakkas are the largest Chinese community in India after Chinese Cantonese people of Indian ancestry. During the time he held office in Kolkata until the late 2000s, Yap Kon Chung, the Hakka ambassador, protected and helped the Chinese residents in India. Specifically, during the Indo-Chinese war of 1962, oppression of Sino-Indian residents by the Indians was escalated. Yap then made appeals to Prime Minister Nehru to bridge a bond between the Indians and Chinese persons. During his office, he was also the principal at a highly regarded school as well as a political facilitator who helped many families migrate to other countries such as Britain, Canada, the United States and parts of Europe until he himself migrated to Toronto, Canada to join his family. Yap died surrounded by family on 18 April 2014, at the age of 97.

Africa

South Africa
Some Hakka people, notably from Taiwan, migrated to South Africa.

Mauritius
The vast majority of Mauritian Chinese are Hakkas. Most of the Mauritian Hakkas emigrated to Mauritius in the mid-1940s came from Northeastern Guangdong, especially from the Meizhou or Meixian region.

As of 2008, the total population of Sino-Mauritian, consisting of Hakka and Cantonese, is around 35,000.

Réunion
Many Chinese people in Réunion are of Hakka origin. They either came to Réunion as indentured workers or as voluntary migrants.

Americas

United States
Hakka from all over the world have also migrated to the USA. One group is the New England Hakka Association, which reminds its members not to forget their roots. One example is a blog by Ying Han Brach called "Searching for My Hakka Roots". Another group is the Hakka Association of New York, which aims to promote Hakka culture across the five boroughs of New York City. In the mid 1970s, the Hakka Benevolent Association in San Francisco was founded by Tu Chung. The association has strong ties with the San Francisco community and offers scholarships to their young members. There are significant Hakka American communities in San Francisco, San Jose, Seattle and Los Angeles.

There are around 20,000 Taiwanese Hakkas in the United States.

Canada
There are several Hakka communities across Canada. One group that embraces on Hakka culture in this diverse country is the Hakka Heritage Alliance. Also see Jamaica.

Jamaica
Most Chinese Jamaicans are Hakka; they have a long history in Jamaica. Between 1854 and 1884, nearly 5,000 Hakkas arrived in Jamaica in three major voyages. The Hakkas seized the opportunity to venture into a new land, embracing the local language, customs and culture. During the 1960s and 1970s, substantial migration of Jamaican Hakkas to the US and Canada have occurred.  The Hakkas in Jamaica came mainly from Dongguan, Huiyang and Bao'an counties of Guangdong Province.

Suriname
The Chinese in Suriname are homogeneous as a group and the great majority can trace their roots to Huidong'an. One famous Hakka is President Henk Chin A Sen.

Guyana
Chinese people are a small minority at Guyana. Guyana's most prominent Hakka Chinese is its first President Arthur Chung.

Oceania

Australia
Hakka people first arrived in Australia in the 1880s. Hakka arrivals were halted along with other Chinese immigrants during the White Australia Policy era from 1901 to 1973 and resumed thereafter. Some estimate that there are now 100,000 Hakka people in Australia.

New Zealand
There are people of Hakka descent in New Zealand.

Tahiti
Hakka people first arrived in Papara, Tahiti in 1865

Population
At a 1994 seminar of the World Hakka Association held in Meixian, statistics showed that there were 6,562,429 Hakkas living abroad.

In 2000, the worldwide population of Hakka was estimated at 36,059,500 and in 2010 it was estimated at 40,745,200.

Another estimate is that approximately 36 million Hakka people are scattered throughout the world. More than 31 million lives in over 200 cities and counties spread throughout five provinces of China (Guangdong, Jiangxi, Guangxi, Fujian, Hunan) as well as Hong Kong.

Hakkaology

Hakkaology is the academic study of the Hakka people and their culture. It encompasses their origins, identity, language, traits, architecture, customs, food, literature, history, politics, economics, diaspora and genealogical records.

The study of the Hakka people first drew attention to Chinese and foreign scholars, adventurers, missionaries, travellers and authors of the Taiping Heavenly Kingdom era. Ernest John Eitel, a prominent German missionary, was one of those who took a great interest in this area. Theodore Hamberg, who also wrote an early English-language account of the Taiping Rebellion, is also considered a forefather of Hakka studies in the West.

Many foreign scholars were full of admiration of the Hakka people. According to prominent sinologist Victor Purcell, the Hakkas "have a stubbornness of disposition that distinguishes them from their fellow Chinese".

Political and military leadership

The Hakkas have had a significant influence, disproportionate to their smaller total numbers, on the course of modern Chinese and overseas Chinese history, particularly as a source of revolutionary, political, military leaders, as well as presidents, prime ministers.

Hakkas started and formed the backbone of the Taiping Heavenly Kingdom, the largest uprising in the modern history of China. The uprising, also known as Jintian Uprising, originated at the Hakka village of Jintian in Guiping, Guangxi province. It was led by the failed Qing scholar, Hong Xiuquan, who was influenced by Protestant missionaries. Hong's charisma tapped into a consciousness of national dissent which identified with his personal interpretations of the Christian message. His following, who were initially Hakka peasants from Guangxi, grew across the southern provinces.

The Taiping army, which included women in their ranks, captured  towns and cities from the defenders, the Taiping troops killed all Manchu children because the Taiping troops with fatal rocks smashed Manchu children's heads Four of the six top Taiping leaders are Hakkas: Hong Xiuquan, Feng Yunshan, Yang Xiuqing and Shi Dakai. Hong Rengan, the Premier of the Kingdom, was the first person in China to advocate modern-style federal government and opening up reforms. The kingdom lasted for thirteen years, from 1851 to 1864.

Hakkas continued to play leading roles during the Xinhai Revolution that overthrew the Qing dynasty and the republican years of China. When Sun Yat-sen was small, together with other children in his village, he used to listen to an old Taiping soldier telling them stories about the heroics of the Taipings. This influenced Sun and he proclaimed that he shall be the second Hong Xiuquan. Sun was to become the Father of modern China and many of his contemporaries were his fellow Hakkas.

Zheng Shiliang, a medical student and classmate of Sun, led the Huizhou Uprising in 1900. Huizhou is an area in Guangdong province where most of the population are Hakkas. Deng Zhiyu led the Huizhou Qinühu Uprising in 1907. All of the Four Martyrs of Honghuagang are Hakkas – one of which was Wen Shengcai who assassinated the Manchu general, Fu Qi, in 1911.

Brothers Hsieh Yi-qiao and Hsieh Liang-mu raised the 100,000 Chinese Yuan needed for the Huanghuagang Uprising from the overseas Chinese community in Nanyang (Southeast Asia) in 1911. At least 27 of the 85 (initially 72 because only 72 bodies could be identified) martyrs of Huanghuagang are Hakkas. Yao Yuping led the Guangdong Northern Expeditionary Force to successive victories against the Qing Army which were vital in the successful defence of the Provisional Government in Nanjing and Puyi's early abdication.

Liao Zhongkai and Deng Keng were Sun Yat-sen's main advisors on financial and military matters respectively. A big majority of the soldiers in the Guangdong Army were Hakkas. Other Hakkas for example, Eugene Chen, was an outstanding foreign minister in the 1920s. Some of the best of Nationalist China generals: Chen Mingshu, Chen Jitang, Xue Yue and Zhang Fakui amongst many others are Hakka as well.

The Hakka occupied communist Bases reached a peak of more than 30,000 square kilometres and a population that numbered more than three million, covering mostly Hakka areas of two provinces: Jiangxi and Fujian. The Hakka city of Ruijin was the capital of the republic.

When it was overrun in 1934 by the Nationalist army in the Fifth of its Encirclement Campaigns, the Communists began their famous Long March with 86,000 soldiers, of which more than 70% were Hakkas. The Fifth Encirclement Campaign was led by Nationalist Hakka general, Xue Yue. During the retreat, the Communists managed to strike a deal with the Hakka warlord controlling Guangdong province, Chen Jitang, to let them pass through Guangdong without a fight. When the People's Liberation Army had its rank structure from 1955 to 1964, the highest number of generals, totalling 54, came from the small Hakka county of Xingguo in Jiangxi province. The county had also previously produced 27 Nationalist generals. Xingguo county is thus known as the Generals' County.

During the same period, there were 132 Hakkas out of 325 generals in Jiangxi, 63 Hakkas out of 83 generals in Fujian, and 8 Hakkas out of 12 generals in Guangdong respectively, not mentioning those from Guangxi, Sichuan and Hunan. The number could have been significantly higher if the majority of the personnel who started the Long March had not perished before reaching its destination. Only less than 7,000 of the original 86,000 personnel had survived it.

Prominent Hakka communist leaders include: Marshal Zhu De, the founder of the Red Army, later known as the People's Liberation Army; Ye Ting, Commander-in-chief, New Fourth Army, one of the two main Chinese communist forces fighting the Japanese during the World War 2 (the other main communist force, Eighth Route Army, was commanded by Zhu De); Marshal Ye Jianying, governor of Guangdong; and Hu Yaobang, where the memorial for his funeral sparked off a pro-democracy movement which led to the Tiananmen Square protests in 1989. In Guangdong, China's most prosperous province, the "Hakka clique" has consistently dominated the provincial government. Guangdong's Hakka governors include Ye Jianying, Ding Sheng, Ye Xuanping and Huang Huahua.

Besides playing leading roles in all the three major revolutions of China, Hakkas had also been prominently involved in many of the wars against foreign intrusion of China. During the First Opium War, Lai Enjue led the Qing navy against the British at the Battle of Kowloon in 1839 and Yan Botao commanded the coastal defence at the Battle of Amoy in 1841. Feng Zicai and Liu Yongfu were instrumental in the defeat of the French at the Battle of Bang Bo which led to the French Retreat from Lạng Sơn and the conclusion of the war in 1885. When the Japanese invaded Taiwan, the Hakka militia forces led by Qiu Fengjia, were able to put up a stiff resistance to the Japanese when the Qing army could not. During the Battle of Shanghai in the Second Sino-Japanese War in 1937, the heroism of Xie Jinyuan and his troops, known as the "Eight Hundred Warriors" in Chinese history, gained international attention and lifted flagging Chinese morale in their successful Defence of Sihang Warehouse against the better equipped Japanese. However, in the ensuing Battle of Nanjing, seventeen Nationalist generals were killed in action, of which six were Hakkas.

During the war against the Japanese, both the commander-in-chiefs of the two main Chinese communist forces, Eighth Route Army and New Fourth Army, are Hakkas: Zhu De and Ye Ting. On the Nationalist side, Xue Yue and Zhang Fakui were commander-in-chiefs for the 9th and 4th War Zones respectively. Called the "Patton of Asia" by the West and the "God of War" by the Chinese, Xue was China's most outstanding general during the war, having won several major battles that killed hundreds of thousands of Japanese troops. Luo Zhuoying was the commander-in-chief for the 1st Route Expeditionary Forces, Burma (China's first participation of a war overseas), 1942.

During the Japanese occupation of Hong Kong from 1941–1945, the Dong River Column guerrilla force was a constant harassment to the Japanese troops. The force, whose members were mostly Hakkas and led by its commander Zeng Sheng, was highly successful due to its strong Hakka network. Noteworthy accomplishments of the partisan guerrilla force included the aiding of British and Commonwealth (British Raj Colonial rulers) prisoners of war to escape successfully from Japanese internment camps and the rescuing of twenty American pilots who parachuted into Hong Kong when they were shot down.

Overseas Hakkas have also been prominent politicians in the countries they had migrated to, many of which are leading political figures of the countries or the Chinese communities there. Since the 20th century, there have been twenty Hakkas who had become heads of state or heads of government in different countries.

In popular culture
 The Guest People, a 1997 30-episode Singapore television drama about four young Hakka men who migrated from China to Singapore in the 1950s and were caught in the tumultuous anti-colonial period of the country's history. The Hakka-language version of the drama was broadcast in Taiwan. The drama was nominated for the Best Drama Series awards in the Asian Television Awards and the New York Television Festival, 1998.
 1895 or Blue Brave: The Legend of Formosa 1895, a 2008 Taiwan Hakka-language film about the Hakka militias fighting the Japanese during the Japanese invasion of Taiwan in 1895. The edited version for television won the Best Drama Series award in the Asian Television Awards, 2009.
 The Great Southern Migration, a 2012 32-episode China television drama about the Hakkas' migration to Southern China during the late Tang dynasty in the 9th century.
 Hakka Women or To Be or Not to Be, a 2014 25-episode Hong Kong television drama about the lives of two Hakka sisters separated when young, one in Hong Kong and the other in China.

See also
Hakka language
Hakka architecture
Hakka cuisine
Hakka hill songs
Han opera (Hakka opera)
Tea-picking opera
Punti-Hakka Clan Wars
Larut War

Further reading

People and identity

Politics

Language

Religion

Food

Family stories
 The book was shortlisted for the 1996 Orange Prize for Fiction.

References

 Rouil, C., Formose: des batailles presque oubliées (Taipei, 2001)

 
Hakka culture
Subgroups of the Han Chinese